Gizyatovo (Ğizzät) is a rural locality (a village) in Novokulevsky Selsoviet, Nurimanovsky District, Bashkortostan, Russia. The population was 30 as of 2010. There is 1 street.

Geography 
Gizyatovo is located 25 km south of Krasnaya Gorka (the district's administrative centre) by road. Kyzyl-Barzhau is the nearest rural locality.

References 

Rural localities in Nurimanovsky District